Steinway & Sons, also known as Steinway, is a German-American piano company, founded in 1853 in Manhattan by German piano builder Heinrich Engelhard Steinweg (later known as Henry E. Steinway). The company's growth led to the opening of a factory in New York City, United States, and later a factory in Hamburg, Germany. The factory in the Queens borough of New York City supplies the Americas, and the factory in Hamburg supplies the rest of the world.

Along with C. Bechstein, Blüthner and Bösendorfer, Steinway & Sons is frequently referred to as one of the "Big Four" piano manufacturers.

Steinway is a prominent piano company, known for making pianos of high quality and for inventions within the area of piano development. Steinway has been granted 139 patents in piano making, with the first in 1857. The company's share of the high-end grand piano market consistently exceeds 80 percent. The dominant position has been criticized, with some musicians and writers arguing that it has blocked innovation and led to a homogenization of the sound favored by pianists.

Steinway pianos have received numerous awards. One of the first is a gold medal in 1855 at the American Institute Fair at the New York Crystal Palace. From 1855 to 1862, Steinway pianos received 35 gold medals. More awards and recognitions followed, including three medals at the International Exposition of 1867 in Paris. The European part of the company holds a royal warrant of appointment to Queen Elizabeth II.  Steinway & Sons was named Company of the Year in 1996 by The Music Trades magazine.  The award was given in recognition of Steinway's "overall performance, quality, value-added products, a well-executed promotional program and disciplined distribution which generated the most impressive results in the entire music industry."

In addition to the flagship Steinway piano line, Steinway markets two other, lower-priced brands of piano sold under the secondary brand names Boston and Essex.

History

Foundation and growth

Heinrich Engelhard Steinweg first made pianos in the 1820s from his house in Seesen, Germany. He made pianos under the Steinweg brand until he emigrated from Germany to America in 1850 with his wife and seven of his nine children. The eldest son, C. F. Theodor Steinweg, remained in Germany, and continued making the Steinweg brand of pianos, partnering with Friedrich Grotrian, a piano dealer, from 1856 to 1865.

In 1853, Heinrich Engelhard Steinweg founded Steinway & Sons. His first workshop in America was in a small loft at the back of 85 Varick Street in the borough of Manhattan in New York City. The first piano made by Steinway & Sons was given the number 483 because Heinrich Engelhard Steinweg had built 482 pianos in Germany. Number 483 was sold to a New York family for $500, and is now on display at the German museum Städtisches Museum Seesen in Seesen, the town in which Heinrich Engelhard Steinweg began his career as a piano maker. A year later, demand was such that the company moved to larger premises at 82–88 Walker Street. It was not until 1864 that the family anglicized their name from Steinweg to Steinway.

By the 1860s, Steinway had built a new factory at Park Avenue between 52nd and 53rd Street (the present site of the Seagram Building) where it covered a whole block. With a workforce of 350 men, production increased from 500 to nearly 1,800 pianos per year. The employees were mostly German immigrants and the official language of the company was German. The pianos themselves underwent numerous substantial improvements through innovations made both at the Steinway factory and elsewhere in the industry based on emerging engineering and scientific research, including developments in the understanding of acoustics. Almost half of the company's 139 patented inventions were developed by the first and second generations of the Steinway family. Steinway's pianos won prizes at exhibitions in New York City, London, and Paris. By 1862, Steinway pianos had received more than 35 medals. Part of Steinway's early reputation arose from its successes in trade fairs.

In 1865, the Steinway family sent a letter to C. F. Theodor Steinweg asking that he leave the German Steinweg factory (by then located in Braunschweig (Brunswick)) and travel to New York City to take over the leadership of the family firm due to the deaths of his brothers Henry and Charles from disease. C. F. Theodor Steinweg obeyed, selling his share of the German piano company to his partner, Wilhelm Grotrian (son of Friedrich Grotrian), and two other workmen, Adolph Helfferich and H.G.W. Schulz. The German factory changed its name from C. F. Theodor Steinweg to Grotrian, Helfferich, Schulz, Th. Steinweg Nachf., later shortened to Grotrian-Steinweg. In New York City, C. F. Theodor Steinweg anglicized his name to C. F. Theodore Steinway. During the next 15 years of his leadership, he kept a home in Braunschweig and traveled often between Germany and the United States.

Around 1870–80, William Steinway (born Wilhelm Steinweg, a son of Heinrich Engelhard Steinweg) established a professional community, the company town Steinway Village, in what is now the Astoria neighborhood of Queens in New York City. Steinway Village was built as its own town and included a new factory (still used today) with its own foundry and sawmill, houses for employees, kindergarten, lending library, post office, volunteer fire department, and parks. Steinway Village later became part of Long Island City. Steinway Street, one of the major streets in the Astoria and Long Island City neighborhoods of Queens, is named after the company.

In 1876, Steinway participated in the Centennial Exposition in Philadelphia. The competition was principally between Steinway, Chickering, and Weber. According to journalist James Barron's account of Steinway's participation in the competition, the company was able to secure success by bribing one of the judges. William Steinway denied to the exposition's organizers that a judge had been paid directly, although Barron states that the judge was bribed through an intermediary: the pianist Frederic Boscovitz. According to freelancer Isabel Wolff, William Steinway would admit in his diary that under his leadership the New York City arm of the company bribed judges at trade fairs to favor Steinway pianos. According to musicologist Donald W. Fostle, it is untrue that Steinway repeatedly bribed judges at trade fairs, and in the one documented case it is unclear if Steinway were enmeshed, along with others, in bribery or were the target of attempted extortion.

To reach European customers who wanted Steinway pianos, and to avoid high European import taxes, William Steinway and C. F. Theodore Steinway established a new piano factory in the free German city of Hamburg in 1880.  The first address of Steinway's factory in Hamburg was at Schanzenstraße in the western part of Hamburg, St. Pauli. C. F. Theodore Steinway became the head of the German factory, and William Steinway went back to the factory in Queens. The Hamburg and Queens factories regularly exchanged experience about their patents and technique despite the large distance between them, and they continue to do so today. C. F. Theodore Steinway was a talented inventor who made many improvements in the construction of the piano. About a third of Steinway's patented inventions are under the name of C. F. Theodore Steinway. The Steinway factory in Hamburg was part laboratory, part factory. Much of the precision cutting and drilling machinery installed in the Queens factory was tried in the Hamburg factory first. C. F. Theodore Steinway died in Braunschweig in 1889, having successfully competed against the Grotrian-Steinweg brand – both the Hamburg-based Steinway factory and the Braunschweig-based Grotrian-Steinweg factory became known for making premium German pianos.

Meanwhile, the 1880s saw the company embroiled in a series of labor disputes between the New York City factory and its workers. Back then, industrialists faced labor strikes frequently. One dispute, in 1880, saw the company lead an industry-wide lockout of piano workers in New York City. In later disputes in the decade, the company hired detectives to spy on its workers, paid police for their backing and protection of company property, and evicted strike leaders from company housing.

In 1883, the Hungarian composer and pianist Franz Liszt wrote in a letter to Steinway: "...The new Steinway grand is a glorious masterpiece in power, sonority, singing quality, and perfect harmonic effects, affording delight even to my old piano-weary fingers. Ever continuing success remains a beautiful attribute of the world-renowned firm of Steinway & Sons. ...Owing to my ignorance of the mechanism of piano construction I can but praise the magnificent result in the volume and quality of sound."

In 1890, Steinway received its first royal warrant, granted by Queen Victoria. The following year the patrons of Steinway included the Prince of Wales and other members of the monarchy and nobility. In subsequent years Steinway was granted royal and imperial warrants from the rulers of Italy, Norway, Persia, Portugal, Romania, Russia, Spain, Sweden, and Turkey.

Steinway Halls

From 1864 to 1866, William Steinway, who is credited with establishing Steinway's success in marketing, oversaw the construction of Steinway Hall on East 14th Street in Manhattan, New York City. Steinway Hall had cost $200,000 to build. It included the second largest concert hall in New York City as well as showrooms for Steinway pianos. To enter the concert hall concertgoers had to pass through the showrooms, a way to advertise Steinway pianos. Sales increased by more than 400 pianos in 1867. Steinway Hall quickly became one of New York City's most prominent cultural centers, housing the New York Philharmonic for the next 25 years until Carnegie Hall opened in 1891.

In 1925, the Steinway Hall on East 14th Street was closed and a new Steinway Hall on West 57th Street was opened. In 2013, Steinway sold the Steinway Hall on West 57th Street for $46 million and moved out of the building at the end of 2014. In 2016, a new Steinway Hall opened on Sixth Avenue.

A second Steinway Hall was opened in London in 1875. It was located first on Wigmore Street, in 1924 it moved to St. George Street, and later it moved to its current address on Marylebone Lane.

Expansion

In 1857, Steinway began to make a line of art case pianos, designed by artists. In 1903, the 100,000th Steinway grand piano was given as a gift to the White House; it was decorated by the artist Thomas Wilmer Dewing. The 100,000th Steinway grand piano was replaced in 1938 by the 300,000th, which remains in use in the White House. The piano is normally placed in the largest room of the White House, the East Room.

Later, Steinway diversified into the manufacture of player pianos. Several systems such as the Welte-Mignon, Duo-Art, and Ampico were incorporated. During the 1920s, Steinway had been selling up to 6,000 pianos a year. In 1929, Steinway constructed one double-keyboard grand piano. It has 164 keys and 4 pedals. (In 2005, Steinway refurbished this instrument).

During World War II, the Steinway factory in Queens received orders from the Allied Armies to build wooden gliders to convey troops behind enemy lines. Steinway could make few normal pianos, but built 2,436 special models called the Victory Vertical or G.I. Piano. It was a small piano that four men could lift, painted olive drab, gray, or blue, designed to be carried aboard ships or dropped by parachute from an airplane to bring music to the soldiers.

The factory in Hamburg, Germany, could sell very few pianos during World War II. No more than a hundred pianos per year left the factory. In the later years of the war, the company was ordered to give up all the prepared and dried wood their lumber yard held for war production. In an air raid over Hamburg, several Allied bombs hit the factory and nearly destroyed it. After the war, Steinway restored the Hamburg factory with help from the Marshall Plan.

In the late 1960s, Steinway brought countersuit against Grotrian-Steinweg to stop them from using the name Steinweg on their pianos. Steinway won the case on appeal in 1975, forcing their competitor to use only the name Grotrian in the United States. The case set a precedent and established the concept of Initial Interest Confusion, in which consumers might be initially attracted to a similarly named but lesser-known brand because of the stronger brand's good reputation.

The 500,000th Steinway

In 1988, Steinway made its 500,000th piano. Designed by artist Wendell Castle, it carries inscriptions of the names of the 832 pianists and 90 ensembles on the Steinway Artist roster of 1987, including Van Cliburn, Vladimir Horowitz and Billy Joel.

Six years later the company launched C. F. Theodore Steinway Academy for Concert Technicians, known simply as Steinway Academy, at Steinway's factory in Hamburg, Germany. There, experienced piano tuners and piano technicians from all over the world receive further training in piano tuning and maintenance. By 2000, Steinway had made its 550,000th piano.

In 2003, Steinway celebrated its 150th anniversary at Carnegie Hall with a three-day concert series with performances by Peter Cincotti, Art Garfunkel, Herbie Hancock, Ben Heppner, Ahmad Jamal, Ramsey Lewis, Randy Newman, Roger Williams, Nancy Wilson, and the Eroica Trio, among others. The first concert featured classical music, the second jazz, and the third pop. As part of the 150th anniversary, fashion designer Karl Lagerfeld created a commemorative Steinway limited edition grand piano.

In 2005, Steinway celebrated the 125th anniversary of the establishment of its factory in Hamburg, Germany. The celebration featured a concert at the Laeiszhalle concert hall in Hamburg with performances by Vladimir and Vovka Ashkenazy, Lang Lang, and Detlef Kraus. 1,800 people from 33 countries attended the concert. As part of the celebration, a 125th anniversary Steinway limited edition grand piano was designed by Count Albrecht von Goertz.

Until his death on September 18, 2008, at the age of 93, Henry Z. Steinway, the great-grandson of the Steinway founder, still worked for Steinway and put his signature on custom-made limited-edition pianos. At several public occasions, Henry Z. Steinway represented the Steinway family. He started at the company in 1937 after graduating from Harvard University. He was president of the company from 1956 to 1977 and was the last Steinway family member to be president of Steinway.

Changes in ownership
In 1972, after a lengthy strike, a long-running financial struggle, high legal expenses, and a lack of business interest among some of the Steinway family members, the firm was sold to CBS. At that time, CBS owned many enterprises in the entertainment industry, including electric guitar and amplifier maker Fender, drum maker Rogers, electro-mechanical piano maker Rhodes, and the baseball team New York Yankees. CBS had plans to form a musical conglomerate that made and sold music in all forms and through all outlets, including records, radio, television, and musical instruments. This new conglomerate was evidently not as successful as CBS had expected, and Steinway was sold in 1985, along with classical and church organ maker Rodgers and flute and piccolo maker Gemeinhardt, to a group of Boston-area investors led by Robert and John P. Birmingham. In order to acquire Steinway, the investors founded the musical conglomerate Steinway Musical Properties. In 1995, Steinway Musical Properties was acquired by Selmer Industries to form the musical conglomerate Steinway Musical Instruments.

In June 2013, private equity firm Kohlberg & Company offered to buy Steinway parent company Steinway Musical Instruments for $438 million. Two months later hedge fund Paulson & Co. Inc. made a higher offer, $512 million, to take the company private. The Steinway Musical Instruments board recommended that shareholders accept this, and in September 2013 Paulson announced completion of the acquisition.

Recent history
After the 2008 economic downturn, Steinway grand piano sales fell by half, and 30 percent of the union employees were laid off at the Queens factory between August 2008 and November 2009. Sales were down 21 percent in 2009 in the United States. But sales began increasing a little in 2010, and they continued to improve the following year.

In 2015, Steinway went back to the player piano industry from around the 1920s by introducing a digital player piano series called Spirio. The technology in the Spirio pianos was created in 2007 by Wayne Stahnke, an Austrian engineer who has previously made digital player piano systems for other piano companies, like Yamaha and Bösendorfer. Wayne Stahnke's technology, originally called Live Performance Model LX, was sold to Steinway in 2014 and re-branded as Spirio. In contrast to player pianos by other brands, a recording option is not available in the Steinway Spirio. In 2018, a recording option was made available in Steinway Spirio pianos, known as the Spirio r.

In 2015, Steinway made its 600,000th piano. The piano features the Fibonacci spiral and Macassar ebony veneer. It took 6,000 hours of work over 4 years to make the piano. It was priced at $2.4 million.

As of early 2021, Paulson & Co. remains the ultimate parent of Steinway & Sons., with head office at 1251 Avenue of the Americas, New York, NY 10020.

Models
Steinway pianos are sold by a worldwide network of around 200 authorized Steinway dealers who operate around 300 showrooms. The primary differentiation between Steinway models is noted by their model letter, which denotes their size and is one of the most important indicators of their price.

Steinway pianos are also a fixture in the secondary market. The price of a used Steinway can vary tremendously, depending on the model (size), age, condition, and the quality of restoration work that has been done. The price of a well-maintained Steinway might be about 50 percent the price of a new one; a piano in average used condition (or worse) might go for 25 percent or  less. Both new Steinways and used Steinways retain their value, with an increase of about 4 percent a year. Additionally, Steinway offers certified pre-owned pianos, which ensures that any restoration work done on the piano has used Steinway parts.

Grands and uprights

Steinway makes the following models of grand pianos and upright pianos:

Steinway's factory in Hamburg makes seven models of the grand piano and two models of an upright piano. (The numerical portion of the model designations represent the length of the grand pianos and the height of the upright pianos in centimetres).
 Grand pianos: S-155, M-170, O-180, A-188, B-211, C-227, D-274
 Upright pianos: V-125, K-132

Steinway's factory in Queens makes six models of the grand piano and one model  of an upright piano. (Steinway has previously made upright pianos in different dimensions.)
 Grand pianos: S (5'1"), M (5'7"), O (5'"), A (6'2"), B (6'11"), D (8'")
Upright Pianos: K (52" high).

Special Designs

Designers and artists such as Karl Lagerfeld, Dakota Jackson, Walter Dorwin Teague, Arthur Blackmore, Joseph Burr Tiffany, Louis Comfort Tiffany, Sir Lawrence Alma-Tadema, George Schastey, and the Herter Brothers have created original designs for Steinway pianos. These specially designed pianos fall under the art case piano line or the limited edition piano line.

Steinway began creating art case pianos in 1857 and the making of art case pianos reached its peak in the late 19th century. Today, Steinway only builds art case pianos on rare occasions. The art case pianos are unique, because Steinway builds only one of each. Some of Steinway's most notable art case pianos are the Alma-Tadema grand piano from 1887, the 100,000th Steinway piano from 1903, the 300,000th Steinway piano from 1938, and the Sound of Harmony from 2008. The Alma-Tadema grand piano was designed by Sir Lawrence Alma-Tadema and received great public acclaim when it was exhibited in London. The piano is made of ebony, inlaid with ivory and mother of pearl, with carved case, lid, and legs, and painted in the inside lid by artist Edward Poynter. It was bought by financier Henry Gurdon Marquand for his New York City mansion. In 1997, it was sold at Christie's auction house in London for $1.2 million, setting a price record for a piano sold at auction. It is now on display at the art museum Clark Art Institute. The 100,000th Steinway piano was given as a gift to the White House in 1903 and is made of cherry tree with gold leaf. It is decorated with coats of arms of the thirteen original states of America and painted by Thomas Dewing with dancing figures representing the nine Muses. The 100,000th Steinway piano was replaced in 1938 by the 300,000th Steinway piano. The gold gilded mahogany legs of the 300,000th piano are carved as eagles and are molded by sculptor Albert Stewart. The piano remains in use in the White House. The Sound of Harmony is decorated with inlays of 40 different woods, including the lid, which replicates artwork by Chinese painter Shi Qi. It took about four years to build the grand piano and it was priced at €1.2 million. The piano was chosen for use at the Expo 2010 Shanghai China.

Examples of limited edition pianos include The Steinway Limited Edition by Karl Lagerfeld created to celebrate the 150th anniversary of the Steinway company in 2003, and the 125th-anniversary grand piano by Count Albrecht von Goertz designed to celebrate the 125th anniversary in 2005 of the foundation of the Steinway factory in Hamburg, Germany.

In 1993, Steinway introduced a new line of specially designed pianos, the Steinway Crown Jewel Collection. The collection consists of grand and upright pianos in Steinway's traditional design, but instead of the traditional ebony finish the pianos of the Steinway Crown Jewel Collection are made in veneers of rare woods from around the world. The collection contains wood veneers such as Macassar ebony, East Indian rosewood, and kewazinga bubinga.

Brands

In addition to the Steinway & Sons brand, Steinway markets two other brands: Boston for the mid-level market and Essex for the entry-level market. Boston and Essex pianos are made using lower-cost components and labor. Pianos of these two brands, made with Steinway owned designs, are manufactured in Asia by suppliers. Steinway allows only its authorized Steinway dealers to carry new Boston and Essex pianos.

 Boston: made for the general mid-ranged piano market at lower prices than Steinway's name brand. Boston pianos are manufactured by Kawai Musical Instruments in Hamamatsu, Japan and Karawang, Indonesia. There are five sizes of Boston grand pianos and three sizes of Boston upright pianos available in a variety of finishes. Grand piano models are GP-156 PE, GP-163 PE, GP-178 PE, GP-193 PE, and GP-215 PE. Upright piano models are UP-118 PE, UP-126 PE, and UP-132 PE. Boston pianos incorporate some of the features of Steinway pianos such as a wider tail design (a feature of the Steinway piano models A-188, B-211, C-227, and D-274) resulting in a larger soundboard area than conventionally shaped pianos of comparable sizes, a maple inner rim, and Steinway's patented Octagrip pinblock.
 Essex: made for the entry-range market and is lower priced than Steinway and Boston pianos. Since 2005, Essex pianos are made at the Pearl River piano factory in Guangzhou, China. Prior to 2005, they were made by Young Chang in Korea. There are two sizes of Essex grand pianos and four sizes of Essex upright pianos available in a wide variety of finishes and furniture designs. Grand piano models are EGP-155 and EGP-173. Upright piano models are EUP-108, EUP-111, EUP-116, and EUP-123. Like the Boston pianos, Essex pianos incorporate some of the features of Steinway pianos as well: a wider tail design, an all-wood action with Steinway geometry with rosette-shaped hammer flanges, and reinforced hammers with metal fasteners.

Piano bank
Steinway maintains a worldwide "piano bank" from which performing pianists, especially Steinway Artists, can select a Steinway piano for use in a certain concert, recording, or tour. The idea is to provide a consistent pool of Steinway pianos with various characteristics for performing pianists' individual touch and tonal preferences. Performing artists choose a piano for use at a certain venue after trying some of the pianos of the "piano bank". This allows a range of Steinway pianos with various touch and tonal characteristics to be available for performers to choose from. Steinway takes responsibility for preparing, tuning, and delivering the piano of the performer's choice to the designated concert hall or recording studio. The performer bears the cost of these services.

The "piano bank" consists of approximately 250 Steinway pianos valued collectively at $12.5 million in 2019.

Manufacture

German and American factories

Some pianists of the past and some active pianists today have expressed a preference for Steinway pianos made at Steinway's factory in Hamburg, or at Steinway's factory in Queens. Emanuel Ax, concert pianist and piano teacher at the Juilliard School, has said that "... the differences have more to do with individual instruments than with where they were made." Larry Fine, American piano technician and author of The Piano Book, considers Hamburg Steinway pianos to be of a higher quality than Queens Steinway pianos. In 2010, the Steinway factory in Queens made some changes in its manufacturing processes and materials in order to upgrade the quality of the Queens Steinway pianos. Larry Fine was invited by Steinway officials to tour the Queens factory to see some of the manufacturing changes. Fine wrote in his Acoustic & Digital Piano Buyer of Spring 2011 that the changes have improved the quality of Queens Steinway pianos, but that Hamburg Steinway pianos are still of a higher quality than Queens Steinway pianos.

The Steinway piano market is divided into two sales areas: the Queens Steinway factory, which supplies North and South America, and the Hamburg Steinway factory, which supplies the rest of the world. At all main Steinway showrooms across the world, customers can order pianos from either factory. The Hamburg and Queens factories exchange parts and craftsmanship, and Steinway parts for both factories come from the same places: Canadian maple is used for the rim, and the soundboards are made from Sitka spruce from Alaska. Both factories use similar crown parameters for their diaphragmatic soundboards. To maintain quality, Steinway has acquired some of its suppliers. Steinway bought the German manufacturer Kluge in Wuppertal, which supplies keyboards, in December 1998, and in November 1999, purchased the company that supplies its cast iron plates, O. S. Kelly Co. in Springfield, Ohio.

A majority of the world's concert halls own at least one Steinway piano, and some (for example Carnegie Hall) have model D-274s from both the Hamburg factory and the Queens factory to satisfy a greater range of preferences.

Components

Each Steinway grand piano consists of more than 12,000 individual parts. A Steinway piano is handcrafted and takes nearly a year to build.

Steinway maintains its own lumber yards at both the Hamburg factory and the Queens factory, aging and drying lumber from nine months to five years. Less than 50 percent is finally used in the making of Steinway pianos. More than 70 percent of the walnut stock is discarded. The woods are purchased when they are available rather than when they are needed.

Rim
The rim of Hamburg-made Steinway pianos consists of layers of hard rock maple and mahogany and the rim of Queens-made Steinway pianos consists of layers of hard rock maple only. The layers are glued and pressed together into one piece in one operation using rim-bending presses that C. F. Theodore Steinway invented in 1880. After the rim-bending process, the rim has to rest from the stress of being bent. It is placed in a conditioning room for a month or more to reduce the moisture content of the wood to approximately six percent.

Plate
Inside the Steinway piano, a cast iron plate provides the strength to support the string tension from 16 tons up to 23 tons. The iron plate is installed above the soundboard and is bronzed, lacquered, polished, and decorated with the Steinway logo. Steinway fabricates plates in its own foundry.

Soundboard and bridges
Steinway makes its soundboard from solid spruce, which allows the soundboard to transmit and amplify sound. The soundboard in Steinway pianos are double-crowned with Steinway's diaphragmatic design. The diaphragmatic soundboard, which was granted a patent in 1936, tapers in thickness from the center to the edges, which permits more freedom of movement resulting in a richer and more lasting tonal response.

Steinway bridges are made of vertically laminated hard rock maple with a hard rock maple cap. The bridges are measured for specific height requirements for each piano and are hand notched.

Keys and action

Steinway keys are made of Bavarian spruce. The surface of the white keys is made of polymer; earlier, they had been made of elephant ivory. Around the 1950s, Steinway switched from using ivory, and some years later use of ivory for piano keys was outlawed. The action parts are mounted on Steinway's tubular metallic frame. The Steinway hammers are cut from virgin wool felt, containing no admixture of other materials.

In 1962, the Queens Steinway factory introduced the Permafree action for its grand pianos, using Teflon parts in place of cloth bushings. The Teflon was intended to withstand wear and humidity changes better than cloth. The Teflon bushings resulted in certain unforeseen problems mainly during changes in weather; they were discontinued in 1983. The Hamburg Steinway factory never implemented the Teflon bushings in its pianos.

Strings and pinblock
The pianos have steel strings in the midsection and treble, with bass strings made of copper-wound steel. The strings are uniformly spaced with one end coiled around the tuning pins, which in turn are inserted in a laminated wooden block called the pinblock or wrestplank. The tuning pins keep the strings tight and are held in place by friction. Steinway also employs front and rear duplex scales, in which the main vibrating section of the string is augmented by a much smaller vibration in the two ends of the string which are fastened in place. Steinway was a friend of the German physicist Hermann von Helmholtz, and this friendship led to the development and Steinway patent in 1872 of front and back aliquots, allowing the traditionally dead sections of strings to vibrate in sympathy with the main string. The result is a fuller, more complex sound.

The pinblock, also known as wrestplank, in Steinways is made of seven layers of hard-textured wood that are glued together, set at a 45° angle to the run of the grain. It is designed to keep the piano in tune longer.

Affiliates

Steinway Artists

In contrast to other piano makers, who presented their pianos to pianists, William Steinway engaged the Russian pianist Anton Rubinstein to play Steinway pianos during Rubinstein's first and only American concert tour from 1872 to 1873, with 215 concerts in 239 days. It was a success for both Rubinstein and Steinway. Thus, the Steinway Artist program was born. Later the Polish pianist Ignacy Jan Paderewski toured America playing 107 concerts on Steinway pianos in 117 days.

, around 1,800 pianists worldwide are official Steinway Artists, which means that they have chosen to perform on Steinway pianos exclusively, and each owns a Steinway. None is paid to do so. Steinway Artists come from different genres: classical, jazz, pop, and rock. A few examples of Steinway Artists are Daniel Barenboim, Harry Connick Jr., Billy Joel, Evgeny Kissin, Diana Krall, and Lang Lang. Some examples of Immortal Steinway Artists are Irving Berlin, Benjamin Britten, George Gershwin, Vladimir Horowitz, Cole Porter, and Sergei Rachmaninoff.

Steinway expects Steinway Artists to perform on Steinway pianos where they are available and in appropriate condition. Artur Schnabel complained once that "Steinway refused to let me use their pianos [i.e., Steinway pianos owned by Steinway] unless I would give up playing the Bechstein piano – which I had used for so many years – in Europe. They insisted that I play on Steinway exclusively, everywhere in the world, otherwise they would not give me their pianos in the United States. That is the reason why from 1923 until 1930 I did not return to America. ... [in] 1933, Steinway changed their attitude and agreed to let me use their pianos in the United States, even if I continued elsewhere to play the Bechstein piano ... Thus, from 1933 on, I went every year to America." In 1972, Steinway responded to Garrick Ohlsson's statement that Bösendorfer was "the Rolls-Royce of pianos" by trucking away the Steinway-owned grand piano that Ohlsson was about to give a recital on at Alice Tully Hall in New York City. Ohlsson ended up performing on a Bösendorfer piano borrowed at the eleventh hour, and Steinway would not let him borrow Steinway-owned pianos for some time. Ohlsson has since made peace with Steinway. Angela Hewitt was removed from the Steinway Artist roster around 2002 after she purchased and performed on a Fazioli piano. After the Canadian pianist Louis Lortie was removed from the Steinway Artist roster in 2003, he complained in a newspaper article that Steinway is trying to establish a monopoly on the concert world by becoming "the Microsoft of pianos." A Steinway spokesman said, in response to Lortie's decision to perform a concert on a Fazioli piano, that Steinway does not want anyone on the Steinway Artist roster who does not want to play the Steinway exclusively.

According to musicologist Stuart de Ocampo, "That Steinway aggressively sought out and paid (in various forms) for artist endorsements must be stressed in order to combat an idealistic notion that the greatest flocked to Steinway simply because it was the best." More generally, Stuart de Ocampo endorses the view of Donald W. Fostle, who wrote in a company history of Steinway that "the genius of Steinways ... ultimately lay in their ability to persuade millions of persons across decades and continents that in this realm of supreme subjectivity, individual variation, incertitude, and ever-changing conditions, there was an absolute best. The assertion, repeated often enough, took on the coloration of fact", but Stuart de Ocampo concludes that "Innovations in piano construction carved out a unique sound for the Steinway pianos in the mid-nineteenth century. Medals at fairs and international exhibitions were the basis of Steinway & Sons' early reputation." Paying for pianists' endorsements back then was not specific to Steinway. As there were financial incentives for testimonials, several famous pianists had no qualms about endorsing more than one piano brand. Franz Liszt endorsed Steinway, Bösendorfer, Chickering, Erard, Ibach, Mason & Risch, and Steck at the same time. Today, no pianist is paid by Steinway, and when Steinway Artists loan pianos from Steinway for a concert or recording session the artists do have to pay Steinway for preparing, tuning, and delivering of the piano. According to management academic David Liebeskind, the Steinway Artist program "... is one of the only pure product endorsements programs, as no artist is paid to play on or endorse a Steinway piano."

The Steinway Artist program has been copied by other piano companies, but Steinway's program is unique in that a pianist must promise to play pianos of the Steinway brand only to become a Steinway Artist. The Steinway Artist designation restricts a pianist's use of pianos by other makers and implies an obligation to perform on Steinway pianos.

All-Steinway Schools

The All-Steinway School designation is given by Steinway to educational institutions of music in which not less than 90 percent of the pianos are designed by Steinway. Steinway does not offer the pianos free of charge but requires that the institutions buy them. Performance venues, teaching studios, and practice rooms for piano students must be equipped with Steinway pianos. Teaching studios and practice rooms for other students may be equipped with Boston or Essex pianos; some All-Steinway Schools have chosen to have Steinway pianos in these rooms also. It is required that the pianos are kept in performance-quality condition and All-Steinway Schools must have piano technicians that participate in Steinway's technical training programs. If the pianos are not maintained in performance-quality condition, Steinway can withdraw the All-Steinway School designation.

The Oberlin Conservatory of Music in Ohio holds the longest partnership with Steinway. They have used Steinway pianos exclusively since 1877, 24 years after Steinway was founded. In 2007, they obtained their 200th Steinway piano, a model D-274 manufactured at Steinway's factory in Hamburg, Germany. Other examples of All-Steinway Schools are the Yale School of Music at Yale University in Connecticut, the Curtis Institute of Music in Pennsylvania, Royal Holloway, University of London, the University of Melbourne Faculty of VCA and MCM in Australia, and the Central Conservatory of Music in Beijing.

In 2007, the Crane School of Music in Potsdam, New York, was added to the All-Steinway School roster, receiving 141 pianos in one $3.8 million order. In 2009, the University of Cincinnati – College-Conservatory of Music in Ohio became designated an All-Steinway School, based on a $4.1 million order of 165 new pianos, one of the largest orders Steinway has ever processed.

, there are more than 190 All-Steinway Schools around the world.

Piano competitions
Several international piano competitions use Steinway pianos. Since the Cleveland International Piano Competition chose to use only Steinway pianos in 1999, Steinway has been selected exclusively by such competitions as the Van Cliburn International Piano Competition in Fort Worth, Texas, the Gina Bachauer International Piano Competition in Salt Lake City, Utah, the International Johann Sebastian Bach Competition in Leipzig, Germany, the Queen Elisabeth Competition in Brussels, Belgium, the Ferruccio Busoni International Piano Competition in Bolzano, Italy, and the Long-Thibaud-Crespin Competition in Paris.

Privately-owned fleets of Steinway Pianos
Whilst some institutions in the UK are designated as All-Steinway Schools, others lease significant fleets of Steinway Pianos from private interests such as The Musiq Group, who own the largest privately owned collection of Steinway Pianos in the UK and also offer maintenance and servicing. The Royal Northern College of Music, Rugby School, The Royal Conservatoire of Scotland, Harrow School and many others hold considerable numbers of Steinway, A, B, C and D models.

Awards

The Steinway company and its leaders have won numerous awards, including:
 In 1839, Heinrich Engelhard Steinweg exhibited three pianos at the state trade exhibition in Braunschweig, Germany, and was awarded a gold medal.
 In 1855, Steinway attended the Metropolitan Mechanics Institute fair in Washington, D.C. and won 1st prize.
 In 1855, Steinway exhibited at the American Institute Fair in the New York Crystal Palace in what is now Bryant Park in New York City. Steinway won a gold medal. A reporter wrote the following about Steinway: "Their square pianos are characterized by the great power of tone, depth and richness in the bass, a full mellowness in the middle register and brilliant purity in the treble, making a scale perfectly equal and singularly melodious throughout its entire range. In touch, they are all that could be desired."
 From 1855 to 1862, Steinway pianos received 35 medals in the United States alone, since which time Steinway entered their pianos at international exhibitions only.
 In 1862, for the International Exhibition in London, Steinway shipped two square pianos and two grand pianos to England (two to Liverpool and two to London) and won 1st prize.
 In 1867, Steinway won three awards at the International Exposition in Paris: the Grand Gold Medal of Honor, the Grand Annual Testimonial Medal, and honorary membership of the Société Nationale des Beaux-Arts. These awards won in Europe increased the demand for Steinway pianos, thus the reason the family looked into opening a store in London. The International Exposition of 1867 established Steinway as the leading choice for pianos in Europe.
 In 1876, at the Centennial Exposition in the United States, Steinway received the two highest awards and a certificate of the judges showing a rating of 95.5 of a possible 96.
 In 1885, Steinway received the gold medal at the International Inventions Exhibition in London and the grand gold medal of the Royal Society of Arts in London.
 In 2007, the National Medal of Arts was awarded to Henry Z. Steinway and presented by US President George W. Bush in an East Room ceremony at the White House. Henry Z. Steinway received the award for "... his devotion to preserving and promoting quality craftsmanship and performance, as an arts patron and advocate for music and music education; and for continuing the fine tradition of the Steinway piano..."
 In 2014, Steinway received the Red Dot product design award for the Arabesque limited edition grand piano. The jury wrote: "The design of the Arabesque impresses through elegance and individuality. It thus excellently complements the high-class product line of this renowned manufacturing house."

Patented inventions

Steinway has been granted 139 patents in piano making; the first in 1857. Some examples of these are:
 Patent No. 26,532 (December 20, 1859): The bass strings are "overstrung" above the treble strings to provide more length and better tonal quality. The invention won 1st prize medal at the 1862 International Exhibition in London. Today, the invention is a standard feature of grand piano construction.
 Patent No. 126,848 (May 14, 1872): Steinway invented the duplex scale on the principle of enabling the freely oscillating parts of the string, directly in front of and behind the segment of the string actually struck, also to resound. The outcome is a large range and fullness of overtones – one of the characteristics of the Steinway sound.
 Patent No. 127,383 (May 28, 1872): In a Steinway piano, the cast iron plate rests on wooden dowels without actually touching the soundboard. It is lightly curved, creating a large hollow between the plate and the soundboard. This cavity acts as a reinforcement of the resonant properties.
 Patent No. 156,388 (October 27, 1874): Steinway invented the middle piano pedal, called the sostenuto pedal. The sostenuto pedal gives the pianist an ability to create what is called an organ pedal point by keeping a specific note's damper, or notes' dampers, in their open position(s), allowing those strings to continue to sound while other notes can be played without continuing to resonate.
 Patent No. 170,645 (November 30, 1875): Steinway's Regulation Action Pilot, also known as Capstan Screw, lifts the parts that drive the hammer toward the string. The Steinway device was adjustable, an advance that simplifies the chore of modifying a piano's action to a pianist's liking.
 Patent No. 233,710 (October 26, 1880): The bridge transmits the vibration of the strings to the soundboard. In a Steinway piano, the bridge consists of vertically glued laminations; a principle that ensures that vibrations are easily developed and forwarded.
 Patent No. 314,742 (March 31, 1885): The rim of Hamburg-made Steinway pianos consists of layers of hard rock maple and mahogany and the rim of Queens-made Steinway pianos consists of layers of hard rock maple only. The layers are pressed together into one piece in one operation.
 Patent No. 2,051,633 (August 18, 1936): The soundboard resembles a membrane. The special molding, gradually tapering from the center to the edge, provides great flexibility and freer vibration across the board.
 Patent No. 3,091,149 (May 28, 1963): The pinblock, also known as wrestplank, is designed to keep the piano in tune longer. Steinway uses seven glued layers of hard-textured wood, set at a 45° angle to the run of the grain.

Acquisitions

Music
Steinway pianos have appeared in numerous records and concerts. A few examples include:

See also

 Note by Note: The Making of Steinway L1037
 Pianomania
Steinway Bros. Oral History collection at Oral History of American Music

Notes

References

Further reading

External links

Company websites
 Steinway & Sons
  Boston | Essex
 Louis Renner GmbH
 Kluge Klaviaturen GmbH

Articles
 Article about Steinway & Sons in The Brander
 Series of nine articles following the production of a Steinway grand piano in The New York Times

Online archives and museums
  
 Steinway & Sons Collection  in the La Guardia and Wagner Archives
 Steinway grand piano from 1868 in the Metropolitan Museum of Art
 William Steinway's diary, family tree of the Steinway family, photos, and more in the National Museum of American History of the Smithsonian Institution
Steinway & Sons collection, 1853-1997 from the Watson Library Special Collections, The Metropolitan Museum of Art, New York.

Piano manufacturing companies
 
1853 establishments in New York (state)
American brands
Articles containing video clips
British Royal Warrant holders
Companies based in Queens, New York
American companies established in 1853
Former CBS Corporation subsidiaries
German brands
Italian Royal Warrant holders
Luxury brands
Manufacturing companies established in 1853
Musical instrument manufacturing companies of Germany
Musical instrument manufacturing companies of the United States
Purveyors to the Court of Sweden
Purveyors to the Imperial and Royal Court
Purveyors to the Russian imperial family
Saxon Royal Warrant holders
Spanish Royal Warrant holders